Thyroid receptor-interacting protein 6 is a protein that in humans is encoded by the TRIP6 gene.

Function 

This gene is a member of the zyxin family and encodes a protein with three LIM zinc-binding domains. This protein localizes to focal adhesion sites and along actin stress fibers. Recruitment of this protein to the plasma membrane occurs in a lysophosphatidic acid (LPA)-dependent manner and it regulates LPA-induced cell migration. Alternatively spliced variants which encode different protein isoforms have been described; however, not all variants have been fully characterized.

Interactions 

TRIP6 has been shown to interact with LPAR2, BCAR1 and HOXA9.

References

Further reading

External links